Raqs sharqi (literally "oriental dancing") is the classical Egyptian style of belly dance that developed during the first half of the 20th century.

Based on the ancient Egyptian women solo dancing with almost nude-outfits, rural Egyptian folk styles and also to modernize it with western influences, such as marching bands, Latin dance, etc., this hybrid style was performed in the cabarets of interbellum period Egypt and in early Egyptian cinema.

The style is often considered the classical style of belly dance, although that term historically referred to the Awalem style (low-class dancers), and today covers a much wider range of Middle Eastern dance as well as Western styles developed from them.

History
Raqs sharqi was developed by Samia Gamal, Tahiya Karioka, Naima Akef, and other dancers who rose to fame during the golden years of the Egyptian film industry. This has come to be considered the classical style of dance in Egypt by the 1950s. These dancers were famous not only for their role in Egyptian films, but also for their performances at the "Opera Casino" opened in 1925 by Badia Masabni.
This venue was a popular place for influential musicians and choreographers from both the US and Europe, so many of the developments pioneered here can be considered new developments in the dance.

Later dancers who were influenced by these artists are Sohair Zaki, Fifi Abdou, Nagwa Fouad and Dalilah. All rose to fame between 1960 and 1980, and are still popular today. Some of these later dancers were the first to choreograph and perform dances using a full 'orchestra' and stage set-up, which had a huge influence upon what is considered the 'classical' style.

Though the basic movements of raqs sharqi are unchanged, the dance form continues to evolve. Nelly Mazloum and Mahmoud Reda are noted for incorporating elements of ballet, and their influence can be seen in modern Egyptian dancers who stand on relevé as they turn or travel in a circle or figure eight.

Costume
Since the 1950s, it has been illegal in Egypt for belly dancers to perform publicly with their midriff uncovered or to display excessive skin. It is therefore becoming more common to wear a long, figure-hugging lycra one-piece gown with strategically placed cut-outs filled in with sheer, flesh-coloured fabric. If a separate bra and skirt are worn, a belt is rarely used and any embellishment is embroidered directly on the tight, sleek lycra skirt. A sheer body stocking must be worn to cover the midsection. Egyptian dancers traditionally dance in bare feet, but these days often wear shoes and even high heels.

Respectability in Egypt

Egyptians do not consider it a respectable profession, despite attempts by several groups to change the perception, and despite the fact that most Egyptians nevertheless continue to employ native Egyptian dancers for wedding receptions and other celebratory events. Many belly dancers performing for tourists in nightclubs today are foreigners, mostly from Europe, particularly Russia since local dancers today face many restrictions and the government have them licensed.
Belly dancers in Egypt have restrictions placed on their costume and movements. No floor work is permitted like in the past, and their midriff must be covered, though many Egyptian nightclubs don't necessarily follow the government guidelines. 

In 2009, a plan to establish a state institute to train belly dancers in Egypt came under heavy fire as it "seriously challenges the Egyptian society's traditions and glaringly violates the constitution", said Farid Esmail a member of the parliament, a thing that was widely viewed by many Egyptian celebrities and dancers as hate against Egyptian arts.

According to some, the dance form that today many call belly dance is extremely old and traces of it can be found up to 6,000 years ago, in some pagan societies who used to worship a feminine deity, to celebrate women's fertility as something magic.

References

Belly dance
Egyptian dances